Aspilapteryx magna is a moth of the family Gracillariidae. It is known from the Alborz region in Iran.

The wingspan is 15–16 mm.

References

Aspilapteryx
Moths of Asia
Moths described in 1985